Kim Floor (born 14 March 1948 in Porvoo) is a Finnish singer, actor and television host. Päivi Paunu and Kim Floor represented Finland in the Eurovision Song Contest in 1972 with the song "Muistathan" ("I Hope You Remember"). In the 1990s, Floor hosted the television game show Onnenpyörä, the Finnish version of Wheel of Fortune.

Discography

Albums 
Evert Taube (1975)

References

External links 
Kim Floor Discogs
Kim Floor Internet Movie Database

1948 births
People from Porvoo
20th-century Finnish male singers
Eurovision Song Contest entrants of 1972
Eurovision Song Contest entrants for Finland
Finnish television presenters
Finnish male television actors
Living people